Beach kabaddi competition at the 2014 Asian Beach Games was held in Phuket, Thailand from 19 to 23 November 2014 at Patong Beach, Phuket.

Medalists

Medal table

Results

Men

Preliminary round

Group A

Group B

Knockout round

Semifinals

Gold medal match

Women

Preliminary round

Gold medal match

References 

Results and Schedules

External links 
 

2014
2014 Asian Beach Games events
Asian